Sabri Fetah Berkel (1907–1993) was a Turkish-Albanian modernist painter; he was one of the most important painters and academic personalities of the last century in Turkey.

Berkel was born in Skopje, where, in 1927, he completed high school at a French lyceum. From 1927 to 1928 he studied at an art school in Belgrade. From 1929–1935 he finished his studies at the Academy of Fine Arts, Florence.

Berkel visited his country Albania in 1982 where he met with his family and parents. Berkel died in Istanbul. 

A crater on Mercury was named after Sabri Berkel.

See also 
Modern Albanian art

References 
  oxfordreference.com
  Nasa.gov
  Bksh.al

External links 
artnet.com
kuman-art.com

Artists from Skopje
1907 births
1993 deaths
Turkish painters
Yugoslav emigrants to Turkey
Turkish people of Albanian descent